Smolenja Vas is a village in the hills northeast of Novo Mesto in southeastern Slovenia. The area is part of the traditional region of Lower Carniola and is now included in the Southeast Slovenia Statistical Region.

The local church, built on the northern outskirts of the village, is dedicated to the Assumption of Mary and belongs to the Parish of Novo Mesto–Sveti Lenart. It was a medieval building that was extensively restyled in the Baroque style in 1644.

References

External links
Smolenja Vas on Geopedia

Populated places in the City Municipality of Novo Mesto